In mathematics, the Wiener process is a real-valued continuous-time stochastic process named in honor of American mathematician Norbert Wiener for his investigations on the mathematical properties of the one-dimensional Brownian motion. It is often also called Brownian motion due to its historical connection with the physical process of the same name originally observed by Scottish botanist Robert Brown. It is one of the best known Lévy processes (càdlàg stochastic processes with stationary independent increments) and occurs frequently in pure and applied mathematics, economics, quantitative finance, evolutionary biology, and physics.

The Wiener process plays an important role in both pure and applied mathematics. In pure mathematics, the Wiener process gave rise to the study of continuous time martingales. It is a key process in terms of which more complicated stochastic processes can be described. As such, it plays a vital role in stochastic calculus, diffusion processes and even potential theory. It is the driving process of Schramm–Loewner evolution. In applied mathematics, the Wiener process is used to represent the integral of a white noise Gaussian process, and so is useful as a model of noise in electronics engineering (see Brownian noise), instrument errors in filtering theory and disturbances in control theory.

The Wiener process has applications throughout the mathematical sciences. In physics it is used to study Brownian motion, the diffusion of minute particles suspended in fluid, and other types of diffusion via the Fokker–Planck and Langevin equations. It also forms the basis for the rigorous path integral formulation of quantum mechanics (by the Feynman–Kac formula, a solution to the Schrödinger equation can be represented in terms of the Wiener process) and the study of eternal inflation in physical cosmology. It is also prominent in the mathematical theory of finance, in particular the Black–Scholes option pricing model.

Characterisations of the Wiener process 
The Wiener process  is characterised by the following properties:

 has independent increments: for every  the future increments   are independent of the past values ,  
 has Gaussian increments:  is normally distributed with mean  and variance , 

A third characterisation is that the Wiener process has a spectral representation as a sine series whose coefficients are independent N(0, 1) random variables.  This representation can be obtained using the Karhunen–Loève theorem.

Another characterisation of a Wiener process is the definite integral (from time zero to time t) of a zero mean, unit variance, delta correlated ("white") Gaussian process.

The Wiener process can be constructed as the scaling limit of a random walk, or other discrete-time stochastic processes with stationary independent increments. This is known as Donsker's theorem. Like the random walk, the Wiener process is recurrent in one or two dimensions (meaning that it returns almost surely to any fixed neighborhood of the origin infinitely often) whereas it is not recurrent in dimensions three and higher. Unlike the random walk, it is scale invariant, meaning that

is a Wiener process for any nonzero constant . An integral based on Wiener measure may be called a Wiener integral.

Wiener process as a limit of random walk
Let  be i.i.d. random variables with mean 0 and variance 1. For each n, define a continuous time stochastic process

This is a random step function.

Properties of a one-dimensional Wiener process

Basic properties 
The unconditional probability density function follows a normal distribution with mean = 0 and variance = t, at a fixed time :

The expectation is zero:

The variance, using the computational formula, is :

These results follow immediately from the definition that increments have a normal distribution, centered at zero. Thus

Covariance and correlation 
The covariance and correlation (where ):

These results follow from the definition that non-overlapping increments are independent, of which only the property that they are uncorrelated is used. Suppose that .

Substituting

we arrive at:

Thus

A corollary useful for simulation is that we can write, for :

where  is an independent standard normal variable.

Wiener representation 
Wiener (1923) also gave a representation of a Brownian path in terms of a random Fourier series. If  are independent Gaussian variables with mean zero and variance one, then

and

The scaled process

Karhunen–Loève theorem).

Running maximum 
The joint distribution of the running maximum

the probability density function of a Half-normal distribution. The expectation is

If at time  the Wiener process has a known value , it is possible to calculate the conditional probability distribution of the maximum in interval  (cf. Probability distribution of extreme points of a Wiener stochastic process). The  cumulative probability distribution function of the maximum value, conditioned by the known value , is:

Self-similarity

Brownian scaling 
For every  the process  is another Wiener process.

Time reversal 

Time inversion 
The process  is another Wiener process.

A class of Brownian martingales 
If a polynomial  satisfies the partial differential equation

then the stochastic process

is a martingale.

More generally, for every polynomial  the following stochastic process is a martingale:

where a is the polynomial

Example:   the process

is a martingale, which shows that the quadratic variation of the martingale  on [0, t] is equal to

About functions  more general than polynomials, see local martingales.

Some properties of sample paths 
The set of all functions w with these properties is of full Wiener measure. That is, a path (sample function) of the Wiener process has all these properties almost surely.

Qualitative properties 
 For every ε > 0, the function w takes both (strictly) positive and (strictly) negative values on (0, ε).
 The function w is continuous everywhere but differentiable nowhere (like the Weierstrass function).
 Points of local maximum of the function w are a dense countable set; the maximum values are pairwise different; each local maximum is sharp in the following sense: if w has a local maximum at  then  The same holds for local minima.
 The function w has no points of local increase, that is, no t > 0 satisfies the following for some ε in (0, t): first, w(s) ≤ w(t) for all s in (t − ε, t), and second, w(s) ≥ w(t) for all s in (t, t + ε). (Local increase is a weaker condition than that w is increasing on (t − ε, t + ε).) The same holds for local decrease.
 The function w is of unbounded variation on every interval.
 The quadratic variation of w over [0,t] is t. 
 Zeros of the function w are a nowhere dense perfect set of Lebesgue measure 0 and Hausdorff dimension 1/2 (therefore, uncountable).

Quantitative properties

Law of the iterated logarithm

Modulus of continuity 
Local modulus of continuity:

Global modulus of continuity (Lévy):

Dimension doubling theorem 
The dimension doubling theorems say that the Hausdorff dimension of a set under a Brownian motion doubles almost surely.

Local time 
The image of the Lebesgue measure on [0, t] under the map w (the pushforward measure) has a density .  Thus,

for a wide class of functions f (namely: all continuous functions; all locally integrable functions; all non-negative measurable functions). The density Lt is (more exactly, can and will be chosen to be) continuous. The number Lt(x) is called the local time at x of w on [0, t]. It is strictly positive for all x of the interval (a, b) where a and b are the least and the greatest value of w on [0, t], respectively. (For x outside this interval the local time evidently vanishes.) Treated as a function of two variables x and t, the local time is still continuous. Treated as a function of t (while x is fixed), the local time is a singular function corresponding to a nonatomic measure on the set of zeros of w.

These continuity properties are fairly non-trivial. Consider that the local time can also be defined (as the density of the pushforward measure) for a smooth function. Then, however,  the density is discontinuous, unless the given function is monotone. In other words, there is a conflict between good behavior of a function and good behavior of its local time. In this sense, the continuity of the local time of the Wiener process is another manifestation of non-smoothness of the trajectory.

Information rate 
The information rate of the Wiener process with respect to the squared error distance, i.e. its quadratic rate-distortion function, is given by 

On the other hand, for any , there exists  large enough and a binary code of no more than  distinct elements such that the expected mean squared error in recovering  from this code is at most .

In many cases, it is impossible to encode the Wiener process without sampling it first. When the Wiener process is sampled at intervals  before applying a binary code to represent these samples, the optimal trade-off between code rate  and expected mean square error  (in estimating the continuous-time Wiener process) follows the parametric representation 

In particular,  is the mean squared error associated only with the sampling operation (without encoding).

Related processes 

The stochastic process defined by

is called a Wiener process with drift μ and infinitesimal variance σ2. These processes exhaust continuous Lévy processes.

Two random processes on the time interval [0, 1] appear, roughly speaking, when conditioning the Wiener process to vanish on both ends of [0,1]. With no further conditioning, the process takes both positive and negative values on [0, 1] and is called Brownian bridge. Conditioned also to stay positive on (0, 1), the process is called Brownian excursion. In both cases a rigorous treatment involves a limiting procedure, since the formula P(A|B) = P(A ∩ B)/P(B)  does not apply when P(B) = 0.

A geometric Brownian motion can be written

It is a stochastic process which is used to model processes that can never take on negative values, such as the value of stocks.

The stochastic process

The time of hitting a single point x > 0 by the Wiener process is a random variable with the Lévy distribution. The family of these random variables (indexed by all positive numbers x) is a left-continuous modification of a Lévy process. The right-continuous modification of this process is given by times of first exit from closed intervals [0, x].

The local time  of a Brownian motion describes the time that the process spends at the point x. Formally

where δ is the Dirac delta function. The behaviour of the local time is characterised by Ray–Knight theorems.

Brownian martingales 
Let A be an event related to the Wiener process (more formally: a set, measurable with respect to the Wiener   measure, in the space of functions), and Xt the conditional probability of A given the Wiener process on the time interval [0, t] (more formally: the Wiener measure of the set of trajectories whose concatenation with the given partial trajectory on [0, t] belongs to A). Then the process Xt is a continuous martingale. Its martingale property follows immediately from the definitions, but its continuity is a very special fact – a special case of a general theorem stating that all Brownian martingales are continuous. A Brownian martingale is, by definition, a martingale adapted to the Brownian filtration; and the Brownian filtration is, by definition, the filtration generated by the Wiener process.

Integrated Brownian motion 
The time-integral of the Wiener process

is called integrated Brownian motion or integrated Wiener process.

For the general case of the process defined by 

In fact,  is always a zero mean normal random variable. This allows for simulation of  given  by taking

where Z is a standard normal variable and

All these results can be seen as direct consequences of Itô isometry.
The n-times-integrated Wiener process is a zero-mean normal variable with variance . This is given by the Cauchy formula for repeated integration.

Time change 
Every continuous martingale (starting at the origin) is a time changed Wiener process.

Example:  2Wt = V(4t) where V is another Wiener process (different from W but distributed like W).

Example.  where  and V is another Wiener process.

In general, if M is a continuous martingale then  where A(t) is the quadratic variation of M on [0, t], and V is a Wiener process.

Corollary. (See also Doob's martingale convergence theorems) Let Mt be a continuous martingale, and

Then only the following two cases are possible:

other cases (such as     etc.) are of probability 0.

Especially, a nonnegative continuous martingale has a finite limit (as t → ∞) almost surely.

All stated (in this subsection) for martingales holds also for local martingales.

Change of measure 
A wide class of continuous semimartingales (especially, of diffusion processes) is related to the Wiener process via a combination of time change and change of measure.

Using this fact, the qualitative properties stated above for the Wiener process can be generalized to a wide class of continuous semimartingales.

Complex-valued Wiener process 

Self-similarity 
Brownian scaling, time reversal, time inversion: the same as in the real-valued case.

Rotation invariance: for every complex number  such that  the process  is another complex-valued Wiener process.

Time change 
If  is an entire function then the process  is a time-changed complex-valued Wiener process.

Example:  where

In contrast to the real-valued case, a complex-valued martingale is generally not a time-changed complex-valued Wiener process.

See also 

Generalities:
 Abstract Wiener space
 Classical Wiener space
 Chernoff's distribution
 Fractal
 Brownian web
 Probability distribution of extreme points of a Wiener stochastic process

Numerical path sampling:
 Euler–Maruyama method
 Walk-on-spheres method

Notes

References 
  (also available online: PDF-files)''

External links 
Article for the school-going child
Brownian Motion, "Diverse and Undulating"
Discusses history, botany and physics of Brown's original observations, with videos
"Einstein's prediction finally witnessed one century later" : a test to observe the velocity of Brownian motion
 

 
Martingale theory
Lévy processes